Tintipán Island is a coral island located in the Archipelago of San Bernardo, Gulf of Morrosquillo, Caribbean Sea. It is governed by Colombia as part of the Bolívar Department.

Tourism

The island is home to several hotels and hostels. Access to the lodgings are by boat as there are no airports or roads.

See also 
 Caribbean region of Colombia
 Insular region of Colombia
 List of islands of South America

References 

Caribbean islands of Colombia
Underwater diving sites in the Caribbean
Underwater diving sites in Colombia